Kuriyama may refer to:

Surname 
 Kuriyama (surname), Japanese surname

Places
 Kuriyama, Hokkaidō, a town in Yūbari District, Sorachi, Hokkaidō, Japan
 Kuriyama, Tochigi, a village located in Shioya District, Tochigi, Japan

Other uses
 Kuriyama Dam, a dam in Hokkaidō, Japan
 Kuriyama River, a river in Chiba Prefecture, Japan